The Children's Literature Festival at the University of Central Missouri is an annual event that happens during the first weekend of March break at the University of Central Missouri in Warrensburg, Missouri. It runs for two and a half days and begins with a Sunday luncheon with guest speaker and is followed by two days of author presentations, primarily to children from area schools. The Children's Literature Festival allows children and adults to meet and interact with authors and illustrators whose books they have read or hope to read.

Authors 
The Children's Literature Festival features many Missouri authors and others from across the country. Every festival includes both authors new to the event and those who have participated previously.

Participants 
The Festival is aimed at students in grades 3-10. Groups come from public and private schools, as well as home schools. School districts of all sizes send groups of students; each group is accompanied by teachers and adult volunteers. Some travel a short distance while others travel for several hours to attend. Many districts and individual teachers have a long association with the Festival. While the majority of participating schools are relatively nearby, some individual attendees come from Nebraska, Iowa, Kentucky, and Arkansas. The festival size has varied over the years. Two of the largest festivals took place in 2008, with 8000 participants, and 2010, with 6700 participants. In 2015, approximately 4,000 adults and children participated.

Volunteers 
The Children's Literature Festival relies on approximately 100 volunteers each year. Volunteers include library faculty and staff, other UCM faculty and staff, Warrensburg High School Honor Society members, other high school and college students, and community members. Volunteers serve in many ways, including assisting authors, picking up authors at the Kansas City airport, transporting them to and from events, and overseeing the author hospitality area. Although many volunteers are local, some come from other parts of the state, or even out of state.

Schedule 
Registration and scheduling begin in January. The event kicks off with a Sunday luncheon with a guest speaker, usually one of the authors. Individuals interested in literature for young people are given the opportunity to select a seat at a table with an author or illustrator. Author and illustrator sessions take place Monday and Tuesday, with presenters speaking to groups of children and adults in 50-minute sessions. Groups can attend up to 5 sessions in a day. Book sales are open each day, giving participants an opportunity to purchase books to have signed at the end of each session. Authors usually present 3 or 4 sessions a day; they also have time to spend with other authors, socializing at lunch and during the evenings.

History
The Children's Festival at the University of Central Missouri began in 1969 when Philip Sadler, Professor of Children's Literature, and Ophelia Gilbert, laboratory school librarian, invited five Missouri authors to speak to local students. In 2011, the Children's Literature Festival received a commendation from the American Association of School Librarians. From 2000 to 2015, Naomi Williamson was the Director of the Children's Literature Festival. In 2014, she received an Exemplary Community Achievement Award for her work on the Festival from the Missouri Humanities Council.

References

External links

Children's literature organizations
University of Central Missouri
1969 establishments in Missouri
Festivals established in 1969